Donald-Olivier Sié (born 3 April 1970) is an Ivorian former professional footballer who played as a midfielder. He participated at the 1992, 1994, 1996, 1998 and 2000 Africa Cup of Nations. 

He played for Toulouse FC in Ligue 1. He later played for lower-league side JS Cugnaux.

Career statistics

Club

International

Honours
Ivory Coast
African Cup of Nations: 1992

References

External links
 
 
 
 

1970 births
Living people
Ivorian footballers
Footballers from Abidjan
Association football midfielders
Ivory Coast international footballers
Africa Cup of Nations-winning players
1992 King Fahd Cup players
1992 African Cup of Nations players
1994 African Cup of Nations players
1996 African Cup of Nations players
1998 African Cup of Nations players
2000 African Cup of Nations players
J1 League players
Ligue 1 players
Championnat National players
ASEC Mimosas players
Nagoya Grampus players
Toulouse FC players
Racing Club de France Football players
Stade de Reims players
Ivorian expatriate footballers
Ivorian expatriate sportspeople in Japan
Expatriate footballers in Japan
Ivorian expatriate sportspeople in France
Expatriate footballers in France